Ceratogymna is a genus of large, primarily frugivorous hornbills (family Bucerotidae) found in the humid forests of Central and West Africa. They are sexually dimorphic: males are all black, while females have brown heads and a smaller casque. Unlike the members of the genus Bycanistes, the two species in the genus Ceratogymna have extensive, primarily blue, bare facial skin and dewlap, and the only white in their plumage is in the tail (although the yellow-casqued wattled hornbill has slight whitish speckling on the neck).

Species

The members of the genus Bycanistes have been included in this genus, but today most authorities consider the two separate.

References

 
Bird genera
 
Taxa named by Charles Lucien Bonaparte